"Noël interdit" (translation: Forbidden Christmas) is a Christmas song by French singer Johnny Hallyday. It was released as a single in late 1973.

Composition and writing 
The song was written by Michel Mallory and Johnny Hallyday. The recording was produced by Jean Renard.

Commercial performance 
In France the single spent one week at no. 1 on the singles sales chart (in December 1973).

Track listing 
7" single Philips JF 6009 419 (1973, France)
 Side 1. "Noël interdit"
 Side 2. "Fou d'amour"

Charts

Cover version 
The song was covered by Les Enfants de l'Accordéon on the 2006 Christmas album Les Enfants de l'Accordéon jouent et chantent Noël.

References

External links 
 Johnny Hallyday – "Noël interdit" (single) at Discogs

1973 songs
1973 singles
French songs
Christmas songs
Johnny Hallyday songs
Philips Records singles
Number-one singles in France
Songs written by Michel Mallory
Songs written by Johnny Hallyday